is a major decision of the Supreme Court of Canada in the matters of the effectiveness of copyright collectives and of fair dealing in Canadian copyright law.

Background
Ever since the 2004 judgment of the SCC in CCH Canadian Ltd v Law Society of Upper Canada, many institutional users have sought to simplify the process of determining what constitutes fair dealing through the adoption of guidelines quantifying what amounts of a work may be acceptable.

When the copyright collective Access Copyright sought to enforce an Interim Tariff in December 2010 that had been approved by the Copyright Board of Canada, York University asserted that any copying it did fell outside the tariff's scope under the Fair Dealing Guidelines it had issued to define its position. In relevant part, the Guidelines stated:

Access Copyright sued York University with respect to royalties due under the Interim Tariff, while York counterclaimed for a declaration stating that its Guidelines were lawful under s. 29 of the Copyright Act.

The courts below

Federal Court of Canada
In a decision released in July 2017, the Federal Court of Canada concluded that Access Copyright was entitled to the royalties as stated in the Interim Tariff, and that the York University fair dealing guidelines were not fair.

Interim Tariff
The Court held that a tariff (whether interim or final) is a form of subordinate legislation that is mandatory and binding on all persons, and that there is no ability to opt out of it. "If York did not copy any works in Access’s repertoire, if it obtained proper permission to copy those works, or if the copying was exempt by law – the fair dealing defence and counterclaim – then the tariff would not be applicable. Absent these conditions, the tariff is mandatory."

Fair dealing
In that decision, emphasis was given to the fact that the CCH six-factor test was the second part of a two-stage analysis in which a user must first identify whether a use was allowed before then assessing whether dealing is fair, and stressed that users must not conflate the two stages. As to the first step:

Turning to the second step of the analysis:

Federal Court of Appeal
The University's appeal to the Federal Court of Appeal was allowed in part in April 2020.

Nature of tariff
Access Copyright's tariff was held not to be of a mandatory nature, as "tariffs do not bind non-licensees". This arose from an analysis of the legislative history concerning copyright tariffs in Canada:

From the Act's introduction in 1921 until 1931, there was no regulation of the activities of performance rights organisations that had been formed. "[I]t was felt to be unfair and unjust that these dealers should possess the power so to control such performing rights as to enable them to exact from people purchasing gramophone records and sheets of music and radio receiving sets such tolls as it might please them to exact."
Amendments in 1931 required these organizations to give notice as to what works they were authorized to collect royalties on, as well as to obtain approval of applicable rates from a newly organized Copyright Appeal Board.
1988 amendments extended the concept of collective rights to all forms of copyright, thus enabling other licensing bodies to be created.
1997 amendments enabled the formation of the present-day framework of copyright collectives.

Canadian jurisprudence has subsequently defined the nature and scope of tariffs:

 If a licensee has paid the amount due under a tariff with respect to the use of a work, he cannot be sued by a performing rights organization.
 If anyone who is not a licensee infringes copyright, the rights holder is able to apply for an injunction.
 A user is free to choose whether or not it will take a licence on the terms set out in the organization's approved statement.
 Organizations can not collect both licence fees and damages for the same use of a work.
 Later amendments have not imposed mandatory requirements on users to follow approved tariffs. "[T]he Board does not make or establish tariffs at all: it approves proposed tariffs submitted to it by collective societies."

Fair dealing
York's counterclaim with respect to the Federal Court's fair dealing analysis was dismissed "on the basis that its Guidelines do not ensure that copying which comes within their terms is fair dealing", noting that "York has not shown that the Federal Court erred in law in its understanding of the relevant factors or that it fell into palpable and overriding error in applying them to the facts."

Aftermath
The decision was described as "jurisprudential analysis of a high order", and several consequences therefrom were noted as possible:

 Although Access Copyright cannot rely on statutory authority to represent its members’ rights, it may be able to become their negotiating agent.
 It could restructure its activities to acquire a stake in its members’ rights, in the same manner as SOCAN has done, in order to sue directly for damages on its own behalf, and statutory damages are of sizeable amounts in comparison to what tariffs may have charged.

It was also pointed out that institutions will not be able to plead a defence of fair dealing based solely on published guidelines, without providing evidence that there are other practices and safeguards to demonstrate the policy was followed, and that copying was actually done for an allowable purpose.

In October 2020, the Supreme Court of Canada granted both parties leave to appeal.

At the Supreme Court of Canada
Access Copyright's appeal was dismissed with costs. York's appeal was dismissed without costs.

Nature of tariff
There was agreement with the Federal Court of Appeal that the tariff is not enforceable against York University. It was also pointed out that the way Access Copyright's operations were structured did not enable it to pursue infringement proceedings on behalf of its members. "Nothing compels Access Copyright and its members to operate this way."

Fair dealing

Drawing upon its reasoning in Daniels v Canada (Indian Affairs and Northern Development), the Court recalled, "The party seeking [declatory] relief must establish that the court has jurisdiction to hear the issue, that the question is real and not theoretical, and that the party raising the issue has a genuine interest in its resolution." Because the tariff in question was unenforceable, there was thus no live dispute. As this was not an action for infringement, the defence of fair dealing did not need to arise. However, the Court found the reasoning of the lower courts flawed in this matter, as it "approached the analysis from an institutional perspective only, leaving out the perspective of the students who use the materials. Both perspectives should be taken into account."

Aftermath
York University subsequent released a statement, in which it asserted that its Guidelines had already addressed the concerns concerning students' rights expressed in the Supreme Court decision. In its statement, Access Copyright pointed out that the economic harm had been proven in court and the Supreme Court had refused to endorse York's Guidelines, and also called on the federal government to enable collectives to pursue enforcement measures more effectively. That sentiment was supported by Copibec and other Quebec publishing organizations, who stated, "We can only applaud the Supreme Court’s refusal to endorse the abusive interpretations of York University and other universities wishing to reproduce works on a massive scale without compensating rights holders."

Concerns were also expressed that the movement towards guidelines that address the user rights of both institutions and students would probably take years because of further resulting litigation, and political intervention may yet be necessary. In Quebec, Université Laval had attempted similar tactics in the matter to York's, but had reached an out-of-court settlement in 2018 that agreed to institute copyright compliance in line with what was already in place at other universities in the province.

Notes and references

Notes

References

Supreme Court of Canada cases
2021 in Canadian case law
Canadian copyright case law